The Last Chance is a 1945 Swiss war film directed by Leopold Lindtberg. It was entered into the 1946 Cannes Film Festival and won the Grand Prize of the Festival (the Golden Palm). The film was selected for screening as part of the Cannes Classics section at the 2016 Cannes Film Festival.

Plot
In 1943, the Allies have landed in southern Italy, so Allied prisoners of war are transported north by train. When the train is bombed from the air at night, some of the prisoners escape. Englishman Lieutenant Halliday and American Sergeant Braddock stumble across each other in the dark and team up.

The next day, they are given a ride in a cart carrying sacks of wheat. The driver manages to talk Italian soldiers out of inspecting his cargo, before letting his passengers off in the countryside. When they reach a river, they split up to search for a boat. The Englishman encounters a pretty young woman washing clothes. The two men get a boat and start rowing, but then the woman runs up and tells them that an armistice has been signed, so they turn around. They head to town, but it is strangely quiet, and nobody is in the streets celebrating. Then the Germans arrive and take over. The woman's uncle gives the two men civilian clothes and recommends they try to sneak aboard a freight train, which they do. At one stop, they watch helplessly as a woman is separated from her husband, who is taken away with others by train by the Germans.

Afterward, they head into the mountains. They encounter a band of partisans, who let them cross a bridge. One of the Italians warns them not to endanger the people in the town. The pair go to the church, where the priest agrees to help them. Refugees return from trying to cross the mountains, driven back by a snow storm. The priest takes Halliday to the inn and introduces him to Giuseppe, the guide. He promises to try to get the entire party, along with the new additions, across tomorrow. He points out a Polish tailor and his niece, a factory worker from Belgrade, a professor more concerned about his papers than his own life, and Frenchwoman Madame Monnier. As Halliday is leaving, Frau Wittels (the woman who lost her husband earlier) and her son Bernard arrive to join the group. Already hiding in the church is British Major Telford. He persuades Halliday and Braddock to stick around and perhaps join the partisans.

A radio broadcast announces that Il Duce, the deposed Italian fascist leader, has been freed by the Germans. A disgruntled former fascist heads to the valley to betray the refugees. That night, shooting is heard coming from the bridge. The people seek the priest for advice. He tells them to hide in the woods, but leave the children and old people in his charge. The priest persuades the three soldiers to lead the refugees to Giuseppe. After they are gone, the fascist informant reluctantly tells the priest that he has to take him to the Germans.

When the refugees reach Giuseppe's village, they find the Germans have gotten there first. Giuseppe's mother tells them her son is dead, along with the rest of the men of the village. Another villager asks the soldiers to take some orphans with them too. Reluctantly, the major agrees. The group head up into the mountains during a snowstorm. The aged tailor cannot keep up; he lays down in the snow and prays. The others find shelter in a mountain rescue hut.

When the storm ends, a German patrol appears. The soldiers have orders to close the frontier, so they bypass the hut, but now the pass is guarded. Halliday proposes he create a diversion, using the major's pistol (and five bullets), but Telford turns him down. Instead, the entire party set out at night, hoping to escape detection. They have to hide when they spot a ski patrol. Bernard breaks into the open and draws the Germans away, though he is shot dead. The others make it into Switzerland, though Halliday is himself shot. A Swiss officer informs them that only children, people over 65 and political refugees can remain. He manages to get authority from the government to let everyone stay. In the final scene, they attend Halliday's funeral.

Cast
As listed in opening credits:
 Ewart G. Morrison as Major Telford
 John Hoy as Lieutenant John Halliday
 Ray Reagan as Sergeant Jim Braddock
 Luisa Rossi as Tonina
 Odeardo Mosini as An Innkeeper
 Giuseppe Galeati as A Carrier
 Romano Calò as Priest
 Leopold Biberti as A Swiss lieutenant
 Therese Giehse as Frau Wittels
 Robert Schwarz as Bernard, her son

Other:
 Tino Erler as Muzio
 Sigfrit Steiner as Military Doctor
 Emil Gerber as Frontier Guard
 Germaine Tournier as Mme. Monnier
 M. Sakhnowsky as Hillel Sokolowski
 Berthe Sakhnowsky as Chanele
 Rudolf Kamft as Professor
 Jean Martin as Dutchman
 Gertrudten Cate as Dutchwoman
 Carlo Romatko as Yugoslav Worker

Production
Produced in Switzerland in 1944, the two British leads had been prisoners of war who escaped from Italy into Switzerland with the one American lead being an Army Air Forces crewman whose plane landed in Switzerland and had been interned. All three were chosen for the film by the director.

Reception
Bosley Crowther, film critic of The New York Times, praised The Last Chance, describing it as "a vivid and honest film" and "a tense, exciting drama based substantially on documented facts."

References

External links

1945 films
1945 war films
Swiss black-and-white films
1940s English-language films
1940s German-language films
1940s Italian-language films
Films directed by Leopold Lindtberg
Films set in 1943
Films set in Italy
Palme d'Or winners
Italian Campaign of World War II films
Swiss war films
Swiss World War II films
1940s multilingual films
Swiss multilingual films